The American Ice Company is a historic ice manufacturing plant located at 2100 West Franklin Street in Baltimore, Maryland, United States.  It is a large industrial brick building  designed by Mortimer & Company and constructed by Fidelity Construction in 1910-11  for the American Ice Company, a business that manufactured and delivered ice throughout the Mid-Atlantic and South. The building is two stories, with the brick laid in American bond, and is 21 bays long.  Three of those bays at one end of the building are slightly projected and topped by a stepped parapet, forming the entrance area of the building.

Baltimore American Ice, which had acquired American Ice in the 1960s, had switched mainly to the production of bagged ice for businesses and dry ice for industrial clients by the 1980s.

A two-alarm fire at Baltimore American Ice heavily damaged the rear of the facility in May 2001, and in early 2004, Baltimore American Ice closed the West Franklin Street factory. A more extensive fire that destroyed the more recent additions to the dry ice plant and caused severe damage to a corner of the original circa 1911 factory occurred on March 2, 2004.

The building was listed on the National Register of Historic Places in 2013. Partial demolition and construction of a new mixed-use event space, restaurant, concert venue, artist incubator, and community facility was set to begin in July 2019, with projected completion by Summer 2020. The project was never started or finished, and as recent as 2022 the property was up for lease, auction, or sale by several real estate companies locally in Baltimore. Currently the site remains empty and untouched.

See also
American Ice Company Baltimore Plant No. 2
 List of ice companies
National Register of Historic Places listings in West and Southwest Baltimore

References

External links 

American Ice Company at Abandoned
American Ice Company at Baltimore Heritage
 American Ice Company at Explore Baltimore Heritage

Buildings and structures in Baltimore
Industrial buildings completed in 1911
Industrial buildings and structures on the National Register of Historic Places in Baltimore
Ice companies
1911 establishments in Maryland